Ignacio Risso Thomasset (born 8 October 1977 in Montevideo) is a Uruguayan footballer manager and former player who played as a forward. He is the current manager of Albion.

Coaching career

Defensor Sporting
After retiring, Risso immediately became a part of Defensor Sporting's technical staff. On 1 April 2019, he was promoted to head coach. After failing to qualify for any international cup, the club announced that Risso had been fired on 12 December 2019.

References

External links

1977 births
Living people
Footballers from Montevideo
Uruguayan footballers
Uruguayan expatriate footballers
Uruguayan Primera División players
Cypriot First Division players
Segunda División players
Argentine Primera División players
Miramar Misiones players
Danubio F.C. players
Club Atlético Lanús footballers
L.D.U. Quito footballers
Quilmes Atlético Club footballers
SD Ponferradina players
Apollon Limassol FC players
Defensor Sporting players
Expatriate footballers in Argentina
Expatriate footballers in Ecuador
Expatriate footballers in Spain
Expatriate footballers in Cyprus
Association football forwards
Uruguayan expatriate sportspeople in Argentina
Uruguayan expatriate sportspeople in Ecuador
Uruguayan expatriate sportspeople in Spain
Uruguayan expatriate sportspeople in Cyprus
Uruguayan football managers
Uruguayan Primera División managers
Defensor Sporting managers